Gourmet Grubb is a insect food start-up based in Cape Town, South Africa. It produces ice cream created with an insect-based milk alternative ("EntoMilk").  EntoMilk is created by blending the larvae of the black soldier fly. The company sells a number of ice cream flavors.

History
Gourmet Grubb was co-founded in 2017 by Leah Bessa, Jean Louwrens, and Llewelyn de Beer. 

In 2018, Bessa spoke at Forbes Africa during their 30 under 30 meet up to discuss how they believe their insect ice cream is changing the food industry.

In 2019, Gourmet Grubb opened a pop-up bug restaurant called The Insect Experience with chef Mario Barnard. It is South Africa's first all-insect restaurant.

Awards
Gourmet Grubb received an award from LUX Life Magazine as the "Most Pioneering Dairy Alternatives Company" in 2019 and the "Culinary Innovation Award" for their EntoMilk Ice Cream.

References 

Insect food companies
Food and drink companies based in Cape Town
Manufacturing companies based in Cape Town